Claire Boles (born 28 May 1998) is an Irish rugby player from Enniskillen, Co Fermanagh. She plays for Railway Union, Ulster and Ireland. She plays for the Ireland women's national rugby union team and the Ireland women's national rugby sevens team. She is a student based in Dublin.

Club career 
Enniskillen native Boles began rugby at her school, Enniskillen Collegiate Grammar, before joining the first girls' team at Enniskillen RFC alongside lifelong friend and Ireland teammate Kathryn Dane.

She was part of the first Ulster team to win Ireland's Under-18 interprovincial title in 2016.

She played with the Ulster XV and Sevens sides before being selected for the Ireland U18 Sevens in 2016, and from there she joined the Ireland Sevens programme and made her senior Sevens debut in Clermont in 2017.

Boles, like Irish teammates Stacey Flood and Katie Heffernan, spent two months in Australia in the summer of 2018, where she played with Bond University in the AON University Sevens.

International career 
Boles made her debut for Ireland XVs in the 2019 Women's Six Nations against Scotland and was also a replacement against Italy and France in that competition.

She suffered a serious hamstring injury playing for her club in early 2020 that needed surgery so missed the 2020 Six Nations.

She was selected for the Ireland women's national rugby union team for the 2021 Women's Six Nations.

She was selected for the Ireland women's national rugby sevens team for the 2021-2022 season.

Personal life 
Boles is studying chemical engineering at the University College Dublin. She has a twin, Katie, who also played rugby for Enniskillen RFC. She grew up on a farm.

References

External links 
 https://www.irishrugby.ie/women/claire-boles/

1998 births
Living people
Irish female rugby union players
Ireland international women's rugby sevens players